Roger Charnock (1588 – 1645) was an English politician who sat in the House of Commons in 1614.

Charnock was the second son of  Robert Charnock, of Charnock or Astley, Lancashire. He was admitted to Gray's Inn on 2 February 1608. In 1614, he was elected Member of Parliament for Newton in the Addled Parliament. 
 
Charnock was the brother of Thomas Charnock who was MP for Newton in 1624.

References

1588 births
1645 deaths
English MPs 1614
Members of Gray's Inn